Distantalna splendida is a cicada species from Southeast Asia, and the sole member of the genus Distantalna. It was previously placed in the genus Tosena. A characteristic that distinguishes Distantalna splendida from the Tosena species is the partly pale hyaline tegmina and wings. The species of Tosena do not have hyaline parts in the tegmina and wings. It has been recorded from India, Myanmar and Thailand.

References

External links
Song of Distantalna splendida
 A photo of a mounted female Distantalna splendida

Arthropods of Thailand
Tosenini